Mataiva Airport is an airport on Mataiva in French Polynesia . It is west of Pahua village. It was constructed in 1999. It received just over 10000 passengers in 2021.

Airlines and destinations

Passenger

References

External links

Airports in French Polynesia